Indonesia–Yugoslavia relations were historical foreign relations between now split-up Socialist Federal Republic of Yugoslavia and Indonesia. Both countries were founding member states of the Non-Aligned Movement. Two countries established formal diplomatic relations in 1954. First diplomatic documents were exchanged as early as 1947. Breakup of Yugoslavia, one of the founding and core members of the Non-Aligned Movement, brought into question the very existence of the Movement which was preserved only by politically pragmatic chairmanship of Indonesia.

History

President of Indonesia Sukarno visited Yugoslavia on multiple occasions in 1956,1958,1960,1963 and 1964 while President of Yugoslavia Josip Broz Tito visited Indonesia in 1958 and 1967. During Sukarno's first visit in 1958 Yugoslav diplomacy perceived its guest (earlier host of the Bandung Conference) as an invaluable dialogue partner in the context of the Poznań protests of 1956, Suez Crisis, President Tito meeting with Nikita Khrushchev and the meeting between Tito, Indian Prime Minister Jawaharlal Nehru and President of Egypt Gamal Abdel Nasser on Brijuni Islands. During the 1964 visit to Belgrade Yugoslav side voiced its concerns over the Indonesia's support of what Belgrade perceived the militant Chinese Communist views on how to settle world problems contrary to Five Principles of Peaceful Coexistence.

Contrary to some other non-aligned countries which during the breakup of Yugoslavia provided diplomatic support to Federal Republic of Yugoslavia (Serbia and Montenegro), Indonesia provided its primary support to the Republic of Bosnia and Herzegovina, Yugoslav successor state with significant Muslim population affected by the Bosnian War. During the May 1998 riots of Indonesia which led to Fall of Suharto and subsequent end of Indonesian occupation of East Timor some analysts raised concerns that events may lead to dissolution of the country similar to violent breakup of Yugoslavia.

See also
Yugoslavia and the Non-Aligned Movement
Indonesia-Serbia relations, Croatia–Indonesia relations, Bosnia and Herzegovina–Indonesia relations
1956 Croatia v Indonesia football match
Death and state funeral of Josip Broz Tito

Further reading
 "Friendly Relations: Indonesia-Yugoslavia". (1958). Ministry of Information of the Republic of Indonesia.
 Ljubodrag Dimić, Aleksandar Raković and Miladin Milošević. (2014). "Yugoslavia and Indonesia, Tito and Sukarno 1945-1967". Archives of Yugoslavia & Archive of the Ministry of Foreign Affairs of the Republic of Serbia & Embassy of the Republic of Indonesia in the Republic of Serbia & National Archives of the Republic of Indonesia.

References

Indonesia
Yugoslavia
Bosnia and Herzegovina–Indonesia relations
Croatia–Indonesia relations
Indonesia–Montenegro relations
Indonesia–North Macedonia relations
Indonesia–Serbia relations
Indonesia–Slovenia relations